Stephan Vinicius Seiler (born 16 September 2000) is a professional footballer who plays as a midfielder for Swiss Super League club Winterthur on loan from Zürich. Born in Brazil, he represents Switzerland internationally.

Club career
Seiler made his professional debut with FC Zürich in a 3–2 Swiss Super League loss to BSC Young Boys on 19 June 2020.

On 31 August 2022, Seiler joined Winterthur on a season-long loan.

International career
Seiler was born in Brazil to a Swiss father and Brazilian mother, and moved to Switzerland at a young age. He is a youth international for Switzerland.

References

External links
 
 Stephan Seiler at Switzerland U16
 Stephan Seiler at Switzerland U17
 Stephan Seiler at Switzerland U19
 Stephan Seiler at Switzerland U20
 SFL Profile

2000 births
Living people
Swiss people of Brazilian descent
Brazilian people of Swiss descent
Sportspeople from Fortaleza
Swiss men's footballers
Brazilian footballers
Association football midfielders
Switzerland youth international footballers
Swiss Super League players
FC Zürich players
FC Winterthur players